Ali Darreh (also Romanized as ‘Ālī Darreh; also known as Āl Darreh) is a village in Panjak-e Rastaq Rural District, Kojur District, Nowshahr County, Mazandaran Province, Iran. At the 2006 census, its population was 287, in 76 families.

References 

Populated places in Nowshahr County